Shalfak (originally Waf-Chastiu, "subduing the foreign lands") is an ancient Egyptian fortress once built up on the western shore of the Second Cataract of the Nile River and now an island in the Lake Nubia in the north of Sudan. Set up in the Middle Kingdom under Senusret III, it is one of a chain of 17 forts which the pharaohs of the 12th Dynasty established to secure their southern frontier during a time where the Egyptian influence was sought out to be expanded. That is why Shalfak, along with the forts of Buhen, Mirgissa, Uronarti, Askut, Dabenarti, Semna, and Kumma, was established within signalling distance of each other.

The fortress occupies a roughly triangular area of about 1800 m2, adapted to the available ground. Its massive mudbrick wall still stands up to 6 metres high and 8 meters thick. Three spur walls, towards the north, west and east, complete the fortification system. The eastern wall protects a stairway leading down to the river to ensure access to a water supply in the case of siege. The internal structures are very well preserved including a command building, barracks, workshops, storerooms and a granary arranged in a grid plan.

Excavations were conducted in February and March 1931 by a team of the Harvard University and the Museum of Fine Arts Boston under Noel F. Wheeler. Since 2017, a team under Claudia Näser from University College London is excavating again.

References

Archaeological sites in Sudan
Fortifications in Africa